Suat Kaya (born 26 August 1967) is a Turkish football manager and former player who is the manager of Tuzlaspor.

His career was all but associated with Galatasaray, with which he won major titles including and the 2000 UEFA Cup. Over the course of 16 seasons, he amassed Süper Lig totals of 353 games and 44 goals.

Club career
Born in Istanbul, Suat started playing professionally with Turkish first division powerhouse Galatasaray SK, making his first-team debuts at age 19. In the following five years, he represented Konyaspor.

Returned in 1992, Suat only played eight times in his first season in his second spell, as Gala won the league. He proceeded to become an essential midfield figure in the following years, notably scoring a career-best eight goals in two consecutive seasons – 1993 to 1995 – helping the Istanbul side to five leagues and two cups (this included two consecutive doubles).

Aged nearly 33, in 2000, Suat appeared, as a starter, in both of Galatasaray's European conquests, the UEFA Cup and the UEFA Super Cup. In June 2003, he retired from football, starting a coaching career in the following year, with Galatasaray's reserves. In the next seasons, he managed several clubs, namely second division's Gaziantep Büyükşehir Belediyespor (two spells).

International career
Suat gained 15 caps for Turkey during seven years, and participated at UEFA Euro 2000. In the final stages in Belgium and the Netherlands, he played in three out of four matches for the national side, assisting Hakan Şükür in the second goal of the 2–0 group stage win against co-hosts Belgium, on 19 June.

Statistics

Club

International

Honours
Galatasaray
Süper Lig: 1986–87, 1992–93, 1993–94, 1996–97, 1997–98, 1998–99, 1999–2000, 2001–02
Turkish Cup: 1992–93, 1995–96, 1998–99, 1999–2000
UEFA Cup: 1999–2000
UEFA Super Cup: 2000

Managerial statistics

References

External links

1967 births
Living people
Footballers from Istanbul
Turkish footballers
Association football midfielders
Süper Lig players
TFF First League players
Galatasaray S.K. footballers
Konyaspor footballers
Turkey international footballers
UEFA Euro 2000 players
Turkish football managers
Gaziantep F.K. managers
Orduspor managers
Göztepe S.K. managers
Çaykur Rizespor managers
Galatasaray A2 football managers
UEFA Cup winning players
Eskişehirspor managers